Gian Marco Moroni (born 13 February 1998) is an Italian professional tennis player.

Moroni has a career-high ATP singles ranking of world No. 159, which he first achieved in June 2022. He also has a career-high ATP doubles ranking of world No. 327, attained in May 2019. He has reached seven career singles finals, with a record of two wins and five losses, including a 1–4 record in ATP Challenger finals. Additionally, he has reached one career doubles final, in which he finished runner-up, at the ITF Futures level.

Career

2019: ATP debut
Moroni made his ATP main draw debut at the 2019 Swiss Open Gstaad after successfully qualifying for the singles main draw. He defeated Luca Margaroli 6–3, 6–4 and Marco Trungelliti 6–3, 6–2 during qualifying rounds and then upset veteran Spaniard Tommy Robredo in the first round with a 6–2, 6–2 straight sets victory. He was ultimately eliminated in the second round by fifth seed and eventual semi-finalist João Sousa 4–6, 4–6.

Challenger and Futures finals

Singles: 7 (2–5)

Doubles: 1 (0–1)

Performance timeline

Singles

References

External links

1998 births
Living people
Italian male tennis players
Tennis players from Rome
21st-century Italian people